Air Jordan is a line of basketball shoes and athletic apparel produced by American corporation Nike, Inc. The first Air Jordan shoe was produced for Hall of Fame former basketball player Michael Jordan during his time with the Chicago Bulls in late 1984 and released to the public on April 1, 1985. The shoes were designed for Nike by Peter Moore, Tinker Hatfield, and Bruce Kilgore.

Product history

Other shoes from the Air Jordan line

The Jordan Packages

 "Spizike"
The Jordan Spiz'ike shoes were released on October 21, 2006, as a tribute to Michael Jordan and Spike Lee's relationship. The relationship began when Mars Blackmon (a character from Spike Lee's film, She's Gotta Have It) became a pitchman in Nike commercials for Air Jordans. The Spiz'ike is a blend of the Jordan III, IV, V, VI, and XX shoes. Only 4,032 pairs were made of the original release, with the proceeds going to a new film institute at Morehouse College.

"Defining Moments"
Released in 2006 retailing at $295 containing the sneakers Michael Jordan wore during his first championship of his two three-peats. The Retro 11 Concord contains a gold Jumpman on the side, but originally was meant to also have gold eyelets spelling out Jordan. This was changed because of color bleeding. The retro 6 Black Infrared replaces its infrared for gold as well. Both shoes contained dog tags to reference the title won and a booklet showcasing a slam dunk highlight of the game and concept art of the shoe. Some of the original DMP Retro 11 Concords have surfaced and are considered some of the rarest Air Jordans.

"Defining Moments II"
The "raging bull pack" retailed for $310 and drew inspiration from the running of the bull that takes place every year in Spain. The pack contains two Air Jordan 5s; the Toro Bravo and the 3m. The Toro Bravo is a red suede sneaker, one of the first of its kind, and it takes inspiration from the red bandanas worn by the runners. The second pair, the 3m, is named after its reflective coating. Both shoes come in a wood gate exterior graphic box with double sided slide out, originally released in 2009.

"Defining Moments III"
The Jordan Brand released a third "Defining Moments" package on July 11, 2009. The 60+ Air Jordan Retro 1 Package is inspired by Jordan scoring 63 points on the Celtics in a double overtime playoff game during his second year. The Air Jordan Retro 1 60+ Package features a re-release of the sneakers that Jordan wore during that game, and a Retro Air Jordan 1 inspired by the Celtics colors and the parquet floors from the old Boston Garden.

"Defining Moments IV"

Retro 6 Infrared Pack
This is the second of the same colorway retro in Jordan Brand history. The first time retro on both colorways were in 2000, they were retro separately. This time, the retro was distinguished from the previous release by using the Jumpman logo instead of the Nike Air logo on the heel.

"Old Love New Love"
2007 brought the release of the Jordan Brand's second two-pair package named the "Old Love New Love" (OLNL), which was released on April 21st. The pack featured two colorways of the Air Jordan I Retro - the original  White/Black-Varsity Red (Black Toes) and a new pair in Black/Varsity-Maize/White. The pack represented Jordan's two main passions, the old love being basketball the new love being motorcycle racing. The Old Love New Love package was sold for $200.00. This release marked a comeback for the Air Jordan 1 paving the way for a slew of colorways, including the modified "Phat" version with additional padding.

"Air Jordan Sixty Plus"
The first Jordan Sixty Plus was released in August 2009. The Jordan 6ixty Plus (60+) is a hybrid sneaker from Jordan Brand that combines the various sneakers Michael Jordan wore when he scored 60 or more points in an NBA Game. In these games, MJ was wearing the Jordan I, II, V and VII. Inspiration came from the Air Jordan 5 because he was wearing those when he scored his career high of 69 points.
 Air Jordan 1 – Toe box shape and perforations
 Air Jordan 2 – Snakeskin accents, rear TPU, lower Eyelets, Jordan "Wings" logo on tongue
 Air Jordan 5 – Midsole/Outsole, shape of tongue, Lacelock, mold of upper near ankle, higher eyelets, "Air Jordan" tag inside of tongue
 Air Jordan 7 – Perforations on side panel, "gap" between ankle area and body of shoe, graphics on tongue, heel tab, 23 on rear TPU

"Air Jordan Collezione/Countdown packages"
This package consisted of two variations of Retro Air Jordan, in which each model number equaled 23. So the Retro I was released in a package with the Retro XXII, the Retro II with the Retro XXI, etc.

"Air Jordan X/XIII"
The first Countdown package consisted of the reintroduced Air Jordan XIII model in white/black-true red. The package also included a pair of the shadow gray Air Jordan X model with the number 23 stitched on the side of the shoes. The package cost

 "Air Jordan IX/XIV"
The second Countdown package consisted of the Air Jordan Retro XIV model in Black/Varsity Red which was similar to the Air Jordan "Last Shot" XIV model though it consisted of a white stitching on the sides, a different color outer arch, and a different colored Jumpman logo on the side. The other Air Jordan was the Air Jordan Retro IX model in a White/Black/True Red colorway.

"Air Jordan XXI/II"
The third Countdown package consisted of the Air Jordan Retro II model in White/Varsity Red. The other Air Jordan in this package was the Air Jordan Retro XXI model in Black/Varsity Red. The package retailed  and was released April 26, 2009.

"Air Jordan XVII/VI"
The fourth Countdown package consisted of the Air Jordan Retro VI model in White/Carmine. The other Air Jordan in this package would be Air Jordan Retro XVII model in Black/Metallic Silver. The package cost  and was released May 24, 2008.

"Air Jordan XII/XI"
The final Countdown package consisted of the Air Jordan Retro XI model in Varsity Red/Black. The other Air Jordan in this package was the Air Jordan Retro XII model in Black/White.

Jordan Fusions
This line of sneakers consist of a fusion of several Air Jordan and Air Force One Models.

Air Jordan XII Air Force One Fusion
A fusion between the Air Jordan XII model and the Midtop Air Force One model.

Air Jordan III Air Force One Fusion
A fusion between the Air Jordan III model and the Air Force One model.

Air Jordan V Air Force One Fusion
This package is the only original colorway of the Air Jordan V model that was not released in the last round of re-releases. Like the Air Jordan V model, the outsole is a mix of black and clear rubber; there is no visible air sole unit in these shoes. The shoe a rubber loop in the back, middle upright cotton jumpman, rubber tongue, and the lace lock first was brought in an infrared colorway. It is said Michael Jordan wears these shoes in his practice games.

Air Jordan VI Air Force One
A fusion between the Air Jordan VI and the Air Force One model.

Air Jordan XX Air Force One Fusion
A fusion between the Air Jordan XX and the Air Force One model. These feature the same laser upper as the original XX but replace the ankle strap and sole with that of the Air Force One. Has the numbers one through six on the heel to represent Jordan's 6 championships ever.

Air Jordan IV Air Force One Fusion
A fusion between the Air Jordan IV and the Midtop Air Force One model.

Air Jordan VIII Air Force One Fusion
A fusion between the Air Jordan VIII and the Midtop Air Force One model.

Air Jordan IX Air Force One Fusion
A fusion between the Air Jordan IX and the Air Force One model.

Air Jordan X Air Force One Fusion
A fusion between the Air Jordan X and the Midtop Air Force One model.

Air Jordan XIII Air Force One Fusion
A fusion between the Air Jordan XIII and the Midtop Air Force One model.

Jordan "6 Rings" shoe

The Jordan 6 Rings (aka Jordan Six Rings, Or Montells) is a combination of the seven Air Jordan shoes that Michael Jordan wore during his 6 championship seasons. That includes the Air Jordan 6, 7, 8, 11, 12, 13 and 14. The Jordan Brand company released the 6 Rings shoes starting in September 2008. 

The Jordan Brand released colorways representative of each team that the Chicago Bulls defeated in their six championship seasons during the 1990s. The colorways include colors borrowed from the L.A. Lakers, Portland Trail Blazers, Phoenix Suns, the Seattle SuperSonics, and Utah Jazz, each shoe of which includes laser-etched graphics detailing specific aspects about that particular championship series, the city of the competing team and so forth. Many other colorways exist.

There also exists a "winterized 6 rings" which are a modified 6 Rings shoe turned into a durable boot designed for the outdoors which changes some of the design and placement of the parts.

Controversy
The Air Jordan line has been associated with many riots, assaults, robberies, and murders, such as the murder of a 15-year-old high school student named Michael Eugene Thomas who was choked to death by one of his peers for a pair of Air Jordan sneakers in 1989.

In 1988, principal Dr. Robin Oden of Mumford High School in Detroit mentioned that clothing-related violence had reached a point where he felt it was necessary to ban certain items of clothing, including the Air Jordan sneaker, from school grounds. This ban was the first of many dress codes implemented in schools after a wave of robberies, beatings, and shootings over possession of Air Jordan sneakers and other items of clothing.

Manufacturing
Nike owns none of the factories where Air Jordans are produced and contracts the work to various factory owners. Company officials say that they only design and market the shoes. However, Nike dictates production terms and standards to the contractor, often without questioning labor or safety practices. In April 1997, 10,000 Indonesian workers went on strike over wage violations at an Air Jordan factory. The same month in Vietnam 1,300 workers went on strike demanding a 1-cent-per-hour raise, and a year later in 1998, 3,000 workers in China went on strike to protest hazardous working conditions and low wages.

Sponsorships
Starting in 2016, Air Jordan became the sole equipment provider for the University of Michigan American football team.  This marked the brand's first venture into a sport besides basketball. As of 2018, Air Jordan was also the equipment provider for the University of North Carolina, University of Oklahoma, and University of Florida football programs.

In 2018, the Jordan brand sponsored an association football (soccer) club for the first time in its history, when French club Paris Saint-Germain F.C. displayed the Jumpman logo on their third kits, worn in the 2018–19 edition of UEFA Champions League.

American football

NCAA College Football
 University of Florida
University of Oklahoma
 University of Michigan
 University of California, Los Angeles
University of North Carolina at Chapel Hill
Howard University

Association football
 Paris Saint-Germain

Auto racing

NASCAR

Teams
23XI Racing

Drivers
Kurt Busch
Denny Hamlin

Basketball

National teams
  Croatia
  France
  Slovenia

Club teams

Africa

  DUC

NBA Official Statement
 National Basketball Association ("Statement" edition, NBA All-Star Game and Charlotte Hornets uniforms only)

NCAA Basketball Teams
 University of North Carolina
 University of Florida
 University of Oklahoma
 University of California, Los Angeles
 University of Houston
 Georgetown University
 Marquette University
Howard University
 San Diego State University

High school teams
 Father Henry Carr Catholic Secondary School

Other teams
  Ateneo de Manila University (Philippine college)

Players

NBA players

 Bam Adebayo
 Carmelo Anthony
 Bismack Biyombo
 Mike Conley Jr.
 Luka Dončić
 Andre Drummond
 Blake Griffin
 Rui Hachimura
 Victor Oladipo
Bradley Beal
 Chris Paul
 Otto Porter Jr.
 Jayson Tatum
 Moe Wagner
 Kemba Walker
 Russell Westbrook
 Zion Williamson
 Cody Zeller

Jordan WINGS
The Jordan Brand partners with the UNCF and others to fund the higher education of underprivileged youth.

Collaborations

Artist collaborations 
Air Jordan is well known for reaching out to music artists, having them help create a unique Air Jordan to call their own. These include celebrities like DJ Khaled, Eminem, J Balvin, Justin Timberlake, Drake, and Joy from Red Velvet. After a collaboration with Nike on its Air Force One in 2017, rapper Travis Scott partnered with Jordan Brand to design Cactus Jack iterations of the Air Jordan 1, Air Jordan 4 and Air Jordan 6.

Designer collaborations 
Air Jordan is popular among the streetwear companies and designers to collaborate with. Jasper Lutwama and Aidan Vryenhoek signed a $10 million deal which will span over 3 years. Together they create several unique Jordans that greatly impact both companies. Some of the most popular collaborations to date include Virgil Abloh and his brand Off-White, Don C and his brand Just Don, Supreme.

Air Dior 
A collaboration between Jordan and the luxury house Dior, the capsule collection Air Dior was created in June 2020. The Dior Jordan is one of the most expensive Jordans offered today. They retail between $10,000-$20,000. Dior created 13,000 pairs of the sneaker; 5,000 of those went straight to top Dior clients, perhaps a disappointing concession for sneaker fans not in the French luxury's house's circle, but the remaining 8,000 were made available to the public via a lottery draw.

Looney Tunes and Space Jam 
On January 26, 1992, Jordan Brand debuted a commercial during Super Bowl XXVI which showed Bugs Bunny enlisting the help of Michael Jordan to outsmart a bullying rival team using cartoon gags. A second ad premiered in 1993 featuring Bugs and Jordan facing off against Marvin the Martian. The ads inspired Jordan's agent, David Falk, to pitch a film starring Jordan and the Looney Tunes characters. The pitch resulted in Space Jam, a commercial success which grossed over $230 million at the box office and generated over $1 billion in merchandise sales. The success of the advertising campaign and the film contributed to the popularity of Looney Tunes and other cartoon characters as motifs in street fashion through the 1990s and 2000s.

Culture references

Television and films

Air (2023)

Notes

References

Further reading

External links

 
 "History of the Air Jordan franchise" at SneakerNews.com
 "Every Jordan Ever Made" at Nike
 "All Jordan Shoes"
 "Factual America Podcast, Episode 27: Air Jordan: A Cultural Phenomenon" where filmmakers Yemi Bamiro and Will Thorne talk about their documentary "One Man and His Shoes" and the history of Air Jordans.

Sportswear brands
Nike brands
Michael Jordan
Products introduced in 1984
1980s fashion
1990s fashion
2000s fashion
2010s fashion
2020s fashion
Basketball culture